Charles Edwin Thompson (11 September 1890 – 19 April 1966) was a Canadian politician. He served one term as the 27th mayor of Vancouver, British Columbia.

Born in Grey County, Ontario, Thompson worked as a teacher, rancher, and an automotive dealer.  In 1945 he became a Vancouver alderman and from 1949 to 1950 he served as mayor. He promoted the construction of city infrastructure such as streets and bridges. A prevailing theme during Thompson's term of office was a widespread belief that communism posed a threat to citizens.

Thompson was a devoted Freemason since 1924, initiated with the Latonia Lodge No. 125 in Saskatchewan and affiliated with the Melrose Lodge No. 67 in Vancouver.

References

"Ontario Births, 1869-1912," database with images, FamilySearch (https://familysearch.org/ark:/61903/1:1:FMXF-MHV : 8 August 2017), Charles Edwin Thompson, 11 Sep 1890; citing Birth, Sullivan Township, Grey, Ontario, Canada, citing Archives of Ontario, Toronto; FHL microfilm 1,846,436.

External links
Vancouver History: list of mayors, accessed 26 August 2006

1890 births
1966 deaths
Canadian anti-communists
Mayors of Vancouver
People from Grey County
20th-century Canadian politicians